Miloš Ćirić (Serbian Cyrillic: Милош Ћирић; 1931–1999) was a Serbian visual artist and educator. The fields of his interest were art graphics, graphic identification, lettering, advertisement, book design, graphic animation, graphic-in-space and heraldry.

Biography
Born in Despotovo in today's Serbia in 1931, Ćirić graduated in 1954 from the Academy of Applied Arts, Belgrade and took his master's degree in 1959, under Professor Mihailo S. Petrov. He was member of "The Applied Artists and Designers Association of Serbia" (ULUPUDS) since 1959 and the Association of Fine Artists of Serbia (ULUS) since 1962.

Titular professor at the Faculty of Applied Arts, University of Arts, Belgrade, Ćirić was the founder of the chair of Graphic Communication and taught at the FAA from 1964 until 1997. He was Head of the Graphic Department from 1974 to 1975.

He was author of extremely large opus: he created more than 1000 logos, a dozen of city coat-of-arms, about 20 one-off and bibliophile books and the same number of original letter designs, a big number of posters and other works from the field of graphic design. The most important works were: design of the exhibition "Robija – škola revolucionara", Beograd – Sremska Mitrovica, 1963; Lettering project: „Ćirićica", Belgrade, 1970/72; Graphic communication of the VMA, Belgrade, 1976/77; Manuscript dedicated to the Sveti Sava Temple, Belgrade, 1985.  His magnum opus is "Chronicles of Symbols" 1–5, a five-volume chronological lexicon of visual symbols from the Balkans, on 2500 pages, with more than 10.000 illustrations, University of Arts, Belgrade, 2009.

In 1999, at the Faculty of Applied Arts, the 'Miloš Ćirić Fund Award' for the best student work in the field of graphic design was founded. Since 2004 at the FAA, in the end of October, a manifestation "Ćira’s Days" has been held in his honour.

Ćirić family is notable by its visual artists. Miloš's wife was Ida Ćirić, and his sons are Rastko and Vukan Ćirić.

Main publications 
 Grafička identifikacija 1961–1981 /Graphic identification 1961-1981/, Srpska književna zadruga, Belgrade, 1982
 Grafičke komunikacije 1954–1984. /Graphic communications 1954-1984/, "Vajat", Belgrade, 1986
 Heraldika 1 /Heraldry 1/, text-book, University of Arts, Belgrade, 1983 (second edition 1988)
 Grb grada Beograda /Coat-of-Arms of Belgrade/, Cicero, Belgrade, 1991
 Grafički znak i simbol /Graphic Sign and Symbol/ (posthumous), Prometej and FAA, 2001
 Letopis simbola /Chronicles of Symbols/ 1–5, University of Arts, Belgrade, 2009.

Bibliophile and hand made books 
 Spomenici /The monuments/, 1961, 10 woodcuts, edition 10 
 Kornjače /Turtles/, 1961, linocuts and offset prints, edition 10   
 Imena /Names/, 1961, 10 woodcuts and linocuts, edition 10 
 Devet triptihona /Nine triptych/, 1962, 10 linocuts, edition 36 
 Beli teror /The white terror/, 1963, 9 woodcuts and linocuts, edition 10 
 Žar ptica velegrada /The metropolitan flaming bird/, 1965, 8 lino-cuts, edition 20 
 Rodoslov /Genealogy/, 1968, 12 sheets, tempera, 20x41 cm  
 Vojnici /Soldiers/, 1969, tempera, 6 plates, 29x36 cm 
 Ratnik /The warrior/, 1970, tempera, 10 plates 
 Ni crno ni belo ni jeste ni nije /Neither black or white, neither yes or no/, 1971, ink and tempera 
 Pečati /The stamps/, 1972, 10 linocuts, edition 12

One-man exhibitions 
Belgrade, 1961, 1965, 1968, 1971, 1982, 1986; Zrenjanin, 1964, 1969; Subotica, 1964; Bol, Brač, 1967; Novi Sad, 1967; Skoplje, 1972; Priboj, 1977; Stolac, 1981.

Awards and recognitions (a choice) 
 The Golden Pen of Belgrade, 1964;
 Large Plaquette of the University of Arts, Belgrade, 1983;
 Main Award of the Ministry of Culture, 1987;
 Award for Life Achievement, ULUPUDS, Belgrade, 1998.

References

External links  

  Ćirić, Vukan. "Words on Miloš Ćirić's typefaces, Tipometar
  Ćirić Rastko. Miloš Ćirić - bibliophile editions (1961-1972), Tipometar
 (Serbian) D. I. "In memoriam: Miloš Ćirić (1931–1999)", Republika, Beograd, broj 224-225, 1-30. novembar 1999. 
 (Serbian) "Miloš Ćirić: Grafike, 9 - 21. februar 2009.", Galerija "Grafički kolektiv", Beograd
  (Serbian) Miloš Ćirić - Grafike/ Miloš Ćirić - Prints, (the catalogue), Galerija „Grafički kolektiv“, Beograd, 2009.

1931 births
1999 deaths
People from Bačka Palanka
University of Arts in Belgrade alumni
Serbian graphic designers
Serbian typographers and type designers
Serbian illustrators
Serbian educators
Serbian artists
Woodcut designers
Book designers
Logo designers
Serbian poster artists
Film poster artists
Serbian caricaturists
Heraldic artists
Heraldists